Stephen I (1065 – 17 May 1102), known as the Rash, was Count of Burgundy, Mâcon and Vienne from 1097 until his death.

Born into a powerful and influential family, he was the son of Count William I of Burgundy and his wife Stephanie. Stephen’s younger brother was Pope Callixtus II.

Stephen succeeded to the County in 1097, following the death in the First Crusade of his elder brother, Reginald II. Stephen participated in the Crusade of 1101, as a commander in the army of Stephen of Blois, helping with the capture of Ancyra and fighting in the disastrous Battle of Mersivan. Stephen later died at the battle of Ramla in 1102. He was succeeded by his eldest son, Reginald III.

Family
He was married to Beatrix of Lorraine, daughter of Gerard, Duke of Lorraine and Hedwige of Namur. Beatrix died in 1116/1117.  Their children were:
 1) Isabella, who married Hugh, Count of Champagne who later renounced her and their son Eudes.
 2) Reginald III of Burgundy
 3) William III of Mâcon
 4) , d. 1163, who married Guigues IV of Albon, Dauphin de Viennois.  They were parents of Guigues V of Albon

References

External links
Medieval Lands Project on Stephen I, Count of Mâcon

1065 births
1102 deaths
Anscarids
Counts of Burgundy
Counts of Mâcon
Counts of Vienne
Christians of the Crusade of 1101
Christians of the First Crusade